Sklabiňa is a village and municipality in Martin District in the Žilina Region of northern Slovakia.

Names
The name is derived from the word Sclavus, Sclabus (Slav).  In historical records the village was first mentioned in 1242 - Zklabonya, later as Sclabonya (1252), Sclouuan (Slovan - the native name of Slavs, 1266), Sclabana (1309) but also as Szklabinka (1736) or in the Hungarized form Szklabinya (1786).

History
The locality was settled already by the people of Púchov culture who built a hillfort near the present-day village. The remains of the hillfort were reused in the Early Middle Ages by the Slavs. The village has always had a close relationship to the castle, the seat of Turiec County.

During the World War II the village became the center of the partisan movement. On 21 August 1944 (one week before the Slovak National Uprising), Sklabiňa became the first village where the partisans raised the Czechoslovak flag and declared that it is a liberated territory of Czechoslovakia. The partisan field trial executed at least 100 people, mostly members of the German minority. The village suffered from several punitive expeditions. Among other, on 30 September 1944 Nazis imprisoned 144 citizens, 3 of them died during the questioning, additional 20 were executed together with other prisoners.

Geography
The municipality lies at an altitude of 480 metres and covers an area of 11.070 km². It has a population of about 608 people.

References

External links

Villages and municipalities in Martin District